Joanna Rakoff (born May 8, 1972) is an American novelist and memoirist.

Early life
Rakoff was born in Nyack, New York in 1972.

Education
Between 1990 and 1994, Rakoff studied English literature at Oberlin College in Ohio. Between 1994 and 1995, she completed an MA in English literature at UCL in London. In 1996 and 1997, she did a year of Ph.D. coursework in English literature at CUNY Graduate Center, before dropping out to study writing at Columbia University, where she completed her MFA in 1998.

Life and career
In 1996, aged 23, Rakoff took a job at one of New York’s oldest literary agencies, Harold Ober Associates. Unbeknownst to Rakoff, the agency looked after the interests of the notoriously reclusive writer J. D. Salinger. In her time at the agency Rakoff's responsibilities included responding to the large volume of fan mail that Salinger received. Rakoff was instructed to respond with a generic response that explained that Salinger did not read fan mail. But she found herself moved by the letters and began writing personal responses to their letters. Her period at the agency coincided with Salinger's aborted publication of the short story "Hapworth 16, 1924". Rakoff's experiences with the agency and her encounters with Salinger himself would later be recounted in her memoir of her time at the literary agency, My Salinger Year (2014).

Rakoff's first novel A Fortunate Age was published in 2009. It received largely positive reviews and was included on many Best of 2009 lists, including NPR, Elle and Booklist, and was awarded the Goldberg Prize for Jewish Fiction by Emerging Writers, an award previously won by Gary Shteyngart, Nathan Englander, and Laura Vapnyar. The novel was a San Francisco Chronicle Best Seller and was published in France by Presses de la Cité.

In 2010, Rakoff created a radio documentary about Salinger and his fan mail for BBC Radio 4, entitled Hey Mr Salinger. Before the documentary aired, the script was circulated in the British publishing industry; an editor read it and got in contact with Rakoff, encouraging her to expand the script into a memoir about her time working for the agency. This memoir became Rakoff's second book; entitled My Salinger Year, it was published in 2014 to broad critical acclaim. It was picked by The Guardian'''s Rachel Cooke as one of the best books of 2014. The memoir has been published in France, Italy, Spain, the Netherlands, Brazil, Argentina, Italy, India, Australia, and the UK. In France, it was a finalist for the Elle Prix de Lectrices. In the Netherlands, it was a finalist for the WIZO Prize.

The book was turned into a 2020 Canadian film of the same name starring Margaret Qualley as Rakoff and Sigourney Weaver as her boss, directed by Philippe Falardeau. It opened the 70th Berlin International Film Festival. The film had its first theatrical release in Australia in January 2021. In March 2021, it opened in the U.S., where it was released by IFC, followed by a May 2021 release in the UK, and releases around the world.

Prior to publishing A Fortunate Age, Rakoff worked as a freelance literary journalist and critic, contributing frequently to the Los Angeles Times, the San Francisco Chronicle, Newsday, the Guardian, and the New York Times, as well as magazines like Vogue, Marie Claire, and O; The Oprah Magazine. For many years, she served as a contributing editor for the literary trade magazine Poets & Writers, where she wrote a long-running column featuring debut writers entitled "First," as well as profiles of writers such as T.C. Boyle and Jonathan Franzen. In 2004, she became the books editor of a new online arts and culture magazine, Tablet, then known as Nextbook. In 2005, she was promoted to features editor, and from 2006-2008, she served as editor-in-chief.

Rakoff is currently under contract with Little, Brown for a new memoir, The Fifth Passenger, which excavates a difficult family secret. The story of this memoir is recounted on the 10/21/2019 episode of Dani Shapiro's podcast Family Secrets.

She regularly contributes book reviews to The New York Times, the Los Angeles Times, and Vogue.

Personal life

Rakoff lives in Cambridge, Massachusetts with her husband, the composer Keeril Makan, a professor at MIT. She has three children.https://freedom.to/blog/joanna-rakoff-finding-the-courage-confidence-clarity-of-mind-to-become-a-best-selling-author/

BibliographyA Fortunate Age. New York: Scribner, 2009. .My Salinger Year''. New York: Knopf Doubleday Publishing Group, 2014. .

References

External links
 Joanna Rakoff Official Website

1972 births
Living people
People from Nyack, New York
Journalists from New York (state)
21st-century American journalists
21st-century American novelists
21st-century American women writers
American women journalists
American women novelists
21st-century American memoirists
American women memoirists
Oberlin College alumni
Alumni of University College London